Buddy Liles was the bass singer for the Florida Boys, a Southern Gospel quartet, from 1972 through the late 1990s.

External links
www.buddyliles.org Official site

References

Living people
American male singers
American gospel singers
Southern gospel performers
1941 births